A parecclesion is a type of side chapel found in Byzantine architecture. 

Examples of existing parecclesions:
 Chora Church
 Pammakaristos Church

References 

Chapels
Byzantine sacred architecture